A110 may refer to:
 A110 road (England), a road in London connecting Woodford and Barnet
 A110 motorway (France), a road connecting Chartres and Sorigny
 A110 road (Malaysia), a road in Perak connecting Gopeng and Kota Baharu Mines 
 Alpine A110, a car
 Austin A110, a 1954 British car
 Intel A110, one branding of the ultra low-power mobile Stealey microprocessor by Intel
 One A110, a model of subnotebook bye one.de aka IL1
 RFA Orangeleaf (A110)